Chinook may refer to:

Languages
Chinookan peoples, several groups of Indigenous people of the U.S. Pacific Northwest
Chinookan languages, a small family of languages spoken by Chinook peoples
Lower Chinook
Upper Chinook language
Chinook Jargon, a nearly extinct American indigenous language
 Billy Chinook (born c. 1827), a chief and member of the Wasco tribe

Places
Chinook, Alberta, a hamlet in southern Alberta, Canada
Chinook (provincial electoral district)
Chinook, Montana, a city in Blaine County, Montana, U.S.
Chinook, Washington, a census-designated place in Pacific County, Washington, U.S
Chinook (crater), on Mars
Chinook Pass, a pass through the Cascade Range in the Washington, U.S.
Chinook Peak, a summit in Mount Rainier National Park, Washington, U.S.
Chinook Scenic Byway, part of State Route 410 in Washington, U.S. 
Chinook oilfield, a former name of Peregrino oilfield, Brazil

Science
Chinook cherry, a cherry cross-breed
Chinook (dog), a rare breed of sled dog
Chinook hops, a variety of hops
Chinook olives, a dish of acorns cured with urine
Chinook salmon, a species of fish
Avro Canada Chinook, Canada's first turbojet engine

Transportation

Aircraft
Air-Sport Chinook, a Polish paraglider
Birdman Chinook, a Canadian ultralight aircraft
Boeing CH-47 Chinook, an American helicopter, and variants
Hermanspann Chinook, an American research glider
Meadowcroft Chinook, an American homebuilt aircraft
Wings of Change Chinhook Bi, an Austrian paraglider design

Ships
MV Chinook, an American passenger-only fast ferry 
USS Chinook, the name of two U.S. Navy ships

Public Transit
Chinook station, a CTrain station in Calgary, Alberta, Canada

Other uses
Chinook (computer program), a computer program that plays draughts (checkers)
Chinook (newspaper), an underground newspaper in Denver, Colorado, U.S., 1969–1972
Chinook Sciences, a company specialising in waste to energy and metal recovery
Chinook wind, föhn winds in the interior West of North America
Chinook Wines, an American winery
Chinook, a Ty, Inc. Beanie Baby toy exclusive to Canada 
The Chinook, an early 20th Century Canadian newspaper published by George Matheson Murray
Lakeshore Chinooks, a Wisconsin baseball team

See also

Chinook Park, Calgary, a neighborhood in Calgary, Alberta, Canada
CF Chinook Centre, a shopping mall in Calgary, Alberta, Canada
List of Chinook jargon placenames
Chrysotoxum chinook, a species of syrphid fly 

Language and nationality disambiguation pages